Gregory Little is a former association football player who represented New Zealand at international level.

Little made his full New Zealand debut in a 5-0 win over Fiji on 3 June 1985 and ended his international playing career with four official A-international caps and one goal to his credit, his final cap an appearance in a 2-0 win over Taiwan on 20 March 1988.

References 

Year of birth missing (living people)
Living people
New Zealand association footballers
New Zealand international footballers

Association footballers not categorized by position